Pfaffstätten is a town in the district of Baden in Lower Austria in Austria.

Population

Sights
At the heart of the town is the Lilienfelderhof, a so-called monastic grange, owned by Lilienfeld Abbey but leased to the Kartause Gaming Private Foundation for 99 years, until 2105. Traditionally dated to 1209, the estate has played a central role in the history of Pfaffstätten and in the lives of its inhabitants, many of whom attended kindergarten there, found short- or long-term employment there, or were married in the estate's church.

References

Cities and towns in Baden District, Austria